Fransèches is a commune in the Creuse department in the Nouvelle-Aquitaine region in central France.

Geography

Population

Sights

 The thirteenth-century church.
 The nineteenth-century sculptures at the village of Masgot.

See also
Communes of the Creuse department

References

Communes of Creuse